Ernst Fischer (born 20 May 1904, date of death unknown) was a Swiss weightlifter. He competed in the men's heavyweight event at the 1936 Summer Olympics.

References

1904 births
Year of death missing
Swiss male weightlifters
Olympic weightlifters of Switzerland
Weightlifters at the 1936 Summer Olympics
Place of birth missing